Pius Grabher (born 11 August 1993) is an Austrian footballer who plays as a midfielder for Austria Lustenau.

Honours
Austria Lustenau
 Austrian Football Second League: 2021–22

References

External links

1985 births
Living people
Austrian footballers
SC Austria Lustenau players
SV Ried players
Association football midfielders
2. Liga (Austria) players
People from Lustenau
Footballers from Vorarlberg